36 Battalion was a light infantry battalion in the South African Army and in later years became part of the SWATF.

History

In May 1978, a group of Omega San soldiers were sent to Bushmanland to form a combat unit originally known as 36 Battalion. The Battalions's soldiers was made up of two subgroups:
 the !Xun from Angola and
 the Dzuwazi (Zu/’hoasi), a subgroup of the !Kung from Bushmanland and the neighbouring north-western corner of Botswana.

Initially, 36 Battalion was commanded by a Capt. G.J. Coetzee and had X2 Battalion Headquarters A: Command & Operations HQ at Tshumkwe. B: Admin / Logistics / Training & Recruitment at Lehebu North.

Renaming
The South West Africa Territory Force SWATF renumbered battalion numbers according to their geographical positioning on the border. The prefix 10 pertained to battalions operation to the west of the Kavango River, 20 to the Kavango or central region and 70 to the eastern region. Under this system, 36 Battalion was renamed 203 Battalion 1982.

In 1981, 36 Battalion CONSOLLIDATED headquarters moved to LUHEBU SOUTH and in 1982 LEHEBU SOUTH  was renamed MANGETTI Dune by Commandant Buitendag. From 1982, 203 Battalion formed part of the reaction force of SWATF, as a tracking battalion.

Commanding Officers
.  1978 Capt. Major 1979-1980 / Commandant 1981

 1982-1983 Commandant Buitendag. In the same year the unit’s badge was designed with the motto “TI # NHU” (find and destroy).
 1984, Commandant J.D.C. Jankowitz. A mounted unit was formed in 1985 as well as a mounted training centre at M’kata.
 1987, Commandant J.L. Pattison. During this time Bravo Company was involved in late part of Operations Packer and Displace in 1988.
 Dec 1988, Lt. Col. Scholtz Van Wyk assumed command of 203 Battalion and was responsible for the relocation of the unit to South Africa, as well the eventual demobilising of the unit for the preparation of Namibian independence.

Withdrawal of 36-203 Battalion to South Africa
The Battalion reverted to 32 Battalion name in 1989 when it transferred back to the SADF.
UN Resolution 435 called on South Africa to reduce its forces in Namibia to 12,000 before the start of any peace process and finally to 1500 by 1989. Several thousand San, fearing reprisal or intimidation, left for South Africa with the SADF.

The soldiers of 36-203 Battalion and their families were settled near Schmidtsdrif in the Northern Cape.

Disbandment
By 1993, 32 Battalion was disbanded at a public ceremony in the Cape Province.
Soldiers were transferred to other units in the Northern Cape and would help patrol the Namibian border.

Structure
By the 1980s, 36 Battalion consisted of:
 a HQ, 
 a Support Company, 
 a Maintenance Section, 
 Alpha Company 
 Bravo Company  of 3 Platoons each, 6 teams, 25 - 30 men, 3 Buffel vehicles and a
 Reconnaissance Wing with 6 Tracker Groups of 5 or 6 men.

Roll of Honour

 Ntamshe, Kumsa

Notes

References
 Biesele, M. Hitchcock, R.K The Ju/'hoan San of Nyae Nyae and Namibian Independence. Development, Democracy, and Indigenous Voices in Southern Africa, 2011 Berghahn Books.
 Heitman, H.R. Modern African Wars (3): South-West Africa,Osprey Publishing, 1991.

Military history of Namibia
Military units and formations of South Africa in the Border War